The United States Army War College (USAWC) is a U.S. Army educational institution in Carlisle, Pennsylvania, on the 500-acre (2 km2) campus of the historic Carlisle Barracks. It provides graduate-level instruction to senior military officers and civilians to prepare them for senior leadership assignments and responsibilities. Each year, a number of Army colonels and lieutenant colonels are considered by a board for admission. Approximately 800 students attend at any one time, half in a two-year-long distance learning program, and the other half in an on-campus, full-time resident program lasting ten months. Upon completion, the college grants its graduates a master's degree in Strategic Studies.

Army applicants must have already completed the U.S. Army Command and General Staff College and the required Joint Professional Military Education for officers in the rank of major.  While the Army handpicks most of the students who participate in the residential program, the student body always includes officers from the other military branches, civilians from agencies such as the Department of Defense, State Department, and National Security Agency, and officers from foreign countries who attend the program as International Fellows.  

The Army War College is a split-functional institution. While a great deal of emphasis is placed on research, students are also instructed in leadership, strategy, and joint-service/international operations.  It is one of the senior service colleges including the Naval War College and the USAF Air War College.  Additionally, the U.S. Department of Defense operates the National War College.

Mission
According to U.S. Army Regulation 10–87, the Army War College "educates and develops leaders for service at the strategic level while advancing knowledge in the global
application of landpower."

History
Established from the principles learned in the Spanish–American War, the college was founded by Secretary of War Elihu Root and U.S. President Theodore Roosevelt, and formally established by General Order 155 on 27 November 1901. Washington Barracks—now called Fort Lesley J. McNair—in Washington, D.C. was chosen as the site. Roosevelt attended the Masonic laying of the cornerstone of Roosevelt Hall on 21 February 1903.

The first president of the Army War College was Major General Samuel B. M. Young in July 1902 and the first students attended the college in 1904.

During the presidency of Montgomery M. Macomb in 1916, President Woodrow Wilson accused students and staff of planning for taking part in an offensive war, even though the United States had not entered World War I.  Wilson was unconvinced by Macomb's explanation that the college was concerned only with the intellectual growth and professional development of its students, and insisted that the school curtail its activities in order to ensure that the U.S. maintained its neutrality.

The college remained at Washington Barracks until the 1940s, when it was closed due to World War II. It reopened in 1950 at Fort Leavenworth, and moved one year later to its present location.

Center for Strategic Leadership
The Center for Strategic Leadership (CSL)'s areas of emphasis are experiential education, Senior Leader education, support to Army Senior Leader research, and support to both US Army War College (USAWC) and Army Senior Leader strategic communication efforts. CSL's professional staff and Collins Hall facility host, support, develop, and conduct world-class events (workshops, symposia, conferences, games, and exercises) focused on a broad range of strategic leadership and national
security issues and concepts in support of the USAWC, the Army, and the Interagency and Joint Communities.

Basic Strategic Art Program

The Basic Strategic Art Program is one of the academic programs taught at the U.S. Army War College. When the program was founded in 2003, its purpose was to provide those officers who had been newly designated into Functional Area 59 (Strategist, formerly Strategic Plans & Policy) an introduction to strategy and to the unique skills, knowledge, and attributes needed as a foundation for their progressive development as army strategists.  FA 59 officers have deployed to combat since the onset of the Global War on Terror in 2001. Since then, graduates of this program served in key positions in Iraq, Afghanistan, all combatant commands, and at the Pentagon.

Peacekeeping and Stability Operations Institute

The Peacekeeping and Stability Operations Institute (PKSOI) is located at the War College.  The institute's mission is to serve as the U.S. Military's Center of Excellence for Stability and Peace Operations at the strategic and operational levels in order to improve military, civilian agency, international, and multinational capabilities and execution.

Army Heritage Education Center

U.S. Army Heritage and Education Center

Strategic Studies Institute

Strategic Studies Institute

Notable alumni

 John A. Lejeune, Class of 1910
 Hunter Liggett, Class of 1910
 Samson L. Faison, Class of 1911
 Ben Hebard Fuller, Class of 1914
 John Wilson Ruckman, Class of 1915
 Walter Krueger, Class of 1921
 Charles H. Corlett, Class of 1925
 Edmund L. Gruber, Class of 1927
 Dwight D. Eisenhower, Class of 1928
 Simon Bolivar Buckner Jr., Class of 1929
 Roy Geiger, Class of 1929
 Oscar Griswold, Class of 1929
 Clarence R. Huebner, Class of 1929
 Lesley J. McNair, Class of 1929
 Troy H. Middleton, Class of 1929
 Franklin C. Sibert, Class of 1929
 Willis D. Crittenberger, Class of 1930
 Robert L. Eichelberger, Class of 1930
 Charles P. Hall, Class of 1930
 Jesse B. Oldendorf, Class of 1930
 Frank Jack Fletcher, Class of 1931
 William R. Schmidt, Class of 1931
 Gilbert R. Cook, Class of 1932
 Leonard T. Gerow, Class of 1932
 Wade H. Haislip, Class of 1932
 Thomas Holcomb, Class of 1932
 John P. Lucas, Class of 1932
 Alexander M. Patch, Class of 1932
 George S. Patton Jr., Class of 1932
 Frank M. Andrews, Class of 1933
 George Kenney, Class of 1933
 Edward Almond, Class of 1934
 Omar Bradley, Class of 1934
 Ulysses S. Grant III, Class of 1934
 Lewis Blaine Hershey, Class of 1934
 Ernest N. Harmon, Class of 1934
 Jonathan Wainwright, Class of 1934
 Norman Cota, Class of 1936
 John R. Hodge, Class of 1936
 Richard Marshall, Class of 1936
 Edward H. Brooks, Class of 1937
 Mark W. Clark, Class of 1937
 Matthew Ridgway, Class of 1937
 Walter Bedell Smith, Class of 1937
 J. Lawton Collins, Class of 1938
 Leslie Groves, Class of 1939
 Paul R. Hawley, Class of 1939
 Hoyt Vandenberg, Class of 1939
 Anthony McAuliffe, Class of 1940
 Maxwell D. Taylor, Class of 1940
 Pedro del Valle, Class of 1940
 William Westmoreland, Class of 1951
 Bruce Palmer Jr., Class of 1952
 Creighton Abrams, Class of 1953
 Earl E. Anderson, Class of 1960
 Bernard W. Rogers, Class of 1960
 Alexander Haig, Class of 1966
 Donn A. Starry, Class of 1966
 H. Norman Schwarzkopf, Class of 1973
 Lewis Sorley, Class of 1973
 George Joulwan, Class of 1978
 John M. Shalikashvili, Class of 1978
 Gordon R. Sullivan, Class of 1978
 Muhammadu Buhari (Nigerian Army, President of Nigeria), Class of 1980
 William W. Hartzog, Class of 1981
 Richard Myers, Class of 1981
 Clara Leach Adams-Ender, Class of 1982
 Donald Fowler, Class of 1983
 Thomas E. White, Class of 1984
 W. Patrick Lang, Class of 1985
 Tommy Franks, Class of 1985
 James Peake, Class of 1988
 Lance L. Smith, Class of 1990
 Abdulkadir Sheikh Dini (Somali Army), Class of 1990
 William G. Boykin, Class of 1991
 John Kimmons, Class of 1995
 Raymond T. Odierno, Class of 1995
 Lloyd Austin, Class of 1996
 Vijay Kumar Singh (Indian Army), Class of 2001
 Frank J. Corte, Jr., Class of 2002
 Parami Kulatunga (Sri Lankan Army), Class of 2003
 Jeffrey W. Talley, Class of 2003
 Bikram Singh, (Indian Army), Class of 2004
 Joe Heck, Class of 2006
 Jeronim Bazo, (Albanian Armed Forces, Chief of the Albanian General Staff) Class of 2006
 Abdel Fattah el-Sisi, (Egyptian Army, President of Egypt) Class of 2006
 Paul M. Nakasone, Class of 2007
 Rizwan Akhtar (Pakistani Army) (Director General Inter-Services Intelligence (ISI)), Class of 2008
 Doug Mastriano, Class of 2010
 Naveed Mukhtar (Pakistani Army) (Director General Inter-Services Intelligence (ISI)), Class of 2011
 Dany Fortin, Class of 2016

See also
Commandant of the Army War College
Industrial College of the Armed Forces
MSC Student Conference on National Affairs
Shippensburg University of Pennsylvania
Staff College
The Institute of World Politics
United States Army Command and General Staff College
United States Military Academy
U.S. Army Strategist

References

External links and sources

Strategic Studies Institute of the US Army War College – the college's strategic and security research facility
Peacekeeping and Stability Operations Institute website
US Military Strategists Association
Strategic Experiential Education Group – the college's Strategic Experiential Education Group
The College's quarterly refereed journal (Parameters), for senior military professionals
U. S. Army heraldic entitlements for the War College
What Is the War College, Anyway?, a May 2004 article from Slate

 
Carlisle, Pennsylvania
War colleges
Educational institutions established in 1901
Military in Pennsylvania
United States Army schools
Universities and colleges in Cumberland County, Pennsylvania
Military education and training in the United States
1901 establishments in Washington, D.C.
United States Army Direct Reporting Units